is the sixth entry in the Tales of the World series, and the third entry in the Radiant Mythology series. Like most of the "Tales Of" games, the game is only available in Japanese. Like other games in the series, it features a group of characters from various Tales games.

Gameplay
Like previous installments in the Radiant Mythology series,  the player character will be capable of changing job classes by talking with this game's Guild Leader. Some job classes have special requirements in order for them to be unlocked, and players will have to expend grade points in order to transform into them.

The game features the past job classes from the two previous installments in the Radiant Mythology series, as well as introducing new ones. 
 Warrior - A fighting class that specializes in close range combat.
 Swordsman - Has a variety of strong and quick sword attacks.
 Thief - Uses quick dagger attacks, giving enemies little chance to counter.
 Mage - Uses offensive magic spells for dealing damage.
 Priest - Specializes in healing and support magic.
 Fighter - Uses fast and power attacks based on martial arts.
 Hunter - Long range fighters that are masters at fighting with a bow.
 Magic Knight - A versatile class that uses both physical and magic attacks.
 Bishop - A master class of offensive and support magic artes.
 Ninja - A class that hides in the shadows and uses trickery to defeat enemies.
 Twinsword - A quick swordsman class that uses dual swords to deal fast attacks on the enemies.
 Brandish - A advanced form of a warrior that fights with broadswords.
 Monk - A fist fighting class that is able to use healing artes.
 Pirate - An agile class that is a master in both close and ranged combat with a dagger and pistol.
 Paladin - A swordsman class that uses broadswords and focuses on using healing artes.
 Gunman - A new class that is a master in ranged combat with dual guns.

As each job class is used, it increases in level and will over time eventually learn its job class specific Hi-ougi/Mystic Arte, which can be used to unleash a great deal of damage.

Characters
Like previous games in the Tales of the World: Radiant Mythology series, the game features various characters each from different games in the Tales series. The game has 80 different characters from past Tales games, including all of the 50 characters from Radiant Mythology 2.

Original
Kanonno Grassvalley - Voiced by Aya Hirano
Rocks (Rocksprings)- Voiced by Hiroki Aiba
Lazaris - Voiced by Satomi Satō
Pasca Kanonno - Voiced by Haruka Kudo
Mormo - Voiced by Daisuke Sakaguchi
Kanonno Earhart - Voiced by Kanae Itou
Widdershin - Voiced by Banjo Ginga
Goede - Voiced by Kenji Nojima

Series

Notes: 
 New to Radiant Mythology.
 Unofficially translated name.

Reception
Famitsu awarded the game a total of 35/40, composed of a 9/9/9/8 score.
The game topped sales in the week it was released selling 222,068 units and improved PSP sales.

References

External links
 Official website 

2011 video games
Action role-playing video games
Alfa System games
Japan-exclusive video games
PlayStation Portable games
PlayStation Portable-only games
World: Radiant Mythology 3, Tales of the
Video games scored by Go Shiina
Video games scored by Motoi Sakuraba
Video games developed in Japan
Video games featuring protagonists of selectable gender
Single-player video games